The Experimental College of the Twin Cities (EXCOtc) was an experimental college in the Minneapolis-Saint Paul area that provided  free, non-credit education courses to the wider community. It was started by Macalester students in the Spring of 2006 in response to a policy change that reflected the shrinking access to higher education nationally and the neo-liberal model in the US and around the world.   A second chapter was created at the University of Minnesota (Twin Cities Campus) in the winter of 2007, as a continuation of protests in support of a strike by the workers of the campus's AFSCME union who demanded a living wage.  Protesting students believed that their school's administration had abandoned the principles of the public land-grant institution: equal access, social justice, and democratic education. So, they decided to devote their energies to forming a new chapter of EXCOtc, as a university that would enact those ideals.

EXCOtc exemplified a community-based emphasis, with organizing groups at Macalester College, the University of Minnesota, and Minneapolis Community and Technical College, including students, staff, and community members, and with an expansive commitment to movement building, community, and education for social change. Courses were free, open to all members of the public, and were taught by volunteer instructors. There were a wide variety of types of courses offered, as reflected in the courses titles of the following group of courses: Latino Labor Organizing for Alternatives to Globalization, Jazz and Competition Dance, Anarchist Anthropology, the Social Responsibility of African American Music, Bike Feminism (Theory and Mechanics), Shape Note Singing, Exploratory Movement, Governing Society: Politics, Economics, and Public Policy, Universal Verbal Language: Tracks of the Infinite on the Human Race and many more.

See also 
 Experimental college movement
 Experimental College at Tufts University

References

External links 
 

Experimental schools